Moussa Léo Sidibé (Sirakoro, 1949) is the Minister of Agriculture, Animal Husbandry and Fishing of Mali since 24 April 2012.

References

Living people
Agriculture Ministers of Mali
1949 births
People from Kayes Region
21st-century Malian people